Frederick Albert Heath (23 December 1935 – 8 October 1966), known professionally as Johnny Kidd, was an English singer-songwriter, best remembered as the lead vocalist for the rock and roll band Johnny Kidd & the Pirates. He was one of the few pre-Beatles British rockers to achieve worldwide fame, mainly for his 1960 hit, "Shakin' All Over".

Biography
Frederick Albert "Freddie" Heath was born in 1935 in Willesden, North London, England. He began playing guitar in a skiffle group in about 1956. The group, known as "The Frantic Four" and later as "The Nutters", covered primarily skiffle, pop and rockabilly. Simultaneously Heath was proving to be a prolific writer; penning most of 30 songs in over three months. Heath's 31st song would prove to be the group's break.

In 1959, Heath and his band were given a recording test for their first single, a rocker titled "Please Don't Touch". Heath was offered a contract with HMV while the rest of the band were employed as session musicians and paid accordingly. The label informed the band that their name "Freddie Heath and the Nutters" would be changed to Johnny Kidd & the Pirates. "Please Don't Touch" peaked at No. 25 in the UK Singles Chart. Although it is not as well known as Kidd's later song "Shakin' All Over", it is a stand-out among other British rock songs of the time. Unlike Billy Fury or Marty Wilde, Kidd did not sing in an imitation voice of Elvis Presley, or one of his American contemporaries. The song also bore a smooth harmony and contained no clear references to the rockabilly style.

Kidd's most famous song as a composer was "Shakin' All Over", which was a No. 1 UK hit in 1960. Kidd's own version did not chart outside of Europe, but two cover versions did: The Guess Who topped the Canadian charts (and hit No. 22 US) with their 1965 version, and in Australia, Normie Rowe topped the charts with it later the same year. In 1970, The Who popularized the song once again on their Live at Leeds album.

The song was originally to be a B-side to a cover of Ricky Nelson's "Yes Sir, That's My Baby". Kidd was told that a self-penned song could be used and together with The Pirates the new number was written in the basement of the Freight Train coffee bar the day prior to recording. In addition to Kidd (vocals), Alan Caddy (guitar), Clem Cattini (drums) and Brian Gregg (bass) session guitarist Joe Moretti was called in by Kidd and Caddy to play lead guitar. It was Moretti who created the song's signature sound by sliding Brian Gregg's cigarette lighter up and down the fret-board of his guitar.

"Shakin' All Over" marked the peak which Kidd would not reach again. Future records did not fare as well in the charts. In 1961 Cattini, Caddy and Gregg left the band and would later play for Joe Meek in The Tornados. Kidd now assembled a new band of Pirates. Johnny Spence was now added to bass, Frank Farley to drums and later Mick Green would become guitarist. The band now toured extensively throughout England and into Europe. Adopting a more beat-influenced style, the group reached the No. 4 in the UK Singles Chart with "I'll Never Get Over You"; and split chart action with The Searchers with "Hungry For Love" (No. 20) in 1963; both songs were penned by Gordon Mills. In time a stage act had also emerged with Kidd and the Pirates dressed as actual pirates. Kidd donned an eye-patch and carried a cutlass which he would swing around on stage, and high kick in time with the music of the band. By 1964 the British Invasion was taking shape and Kidd was left in the shadows. Kidd had another new group by this stage "The New Pirates", but recordings had now become covers of R&B and pop songs. By 1966, it would seem that Kidd was on the verge of a re-emergence but this was soon to be cut short.

Kidd died at age 30 in 1966, in a motor car collision on the A58, Bury New Road, Breightmet, Bolton, Lancashire (Greater Manchester since 1974), around 2 am on 8 October. The Ford Cortina in which he was travelling as a passenger had a head-on collision with a Mini, driven by trainee accountant Peter Metcalfe.  Metcalfe's 17-year-old girlfriend, Helen Read, of Tottington, Lancashire (Greater Manchester since 1974), also died in the accident; they were returning from a 21st birthday party. The New Pirates' bassist Nick Simper, who later became an original member of Deep Purple, was also in the car with Kidd, but he suffered only some cuts and a broken arm.

Kidd was cremated at Golders Green Crematorium, London.

Legacy
In hindsight Kidd was both musically and visually important for the rock music genre. Long before the likes of Paul Revere and the Raiders and Alice Cooper and other such performers dressed up for a performance, Kidd and his contemporary Screaming Lord Sutch were already doing so. Kidd and the Pirates were a transitional band. In a time before bands like The Rolling Stones, The Yardbirds and The Animals, Kidd was recording music that placed increased emphasis on electric blues and R&B. His records circa 1961–64 included Willie Dixon's "I Just Want To Make Love To You", Bo Diddley's "I Can Tell", Willie Perryman's "Dr Feel-good" and Richie Barrett's "Some Other Guy". These are songs that are not sung in imitation of the original recording artists but instead Kidd put his own stamp upon the song. These were the types of changes that would become more crucial as British blues gained more ground in the early 1960s. Many rock historians consider Kidd's 1962 No. 48 UK disc "A Shot of Rhythm and Blues" to be the sonic bridge between British rock and roll and British beat/British R&B.

See also
 Johnny Kidd & the Pirates

References

Further reading
 Besse, Josette and Jean-Loup Jouve. Vince Taylor, Johnny Kidd. Paris: Éditions Horus, 1979 
 Hunt, Keith. Shakin' All Over: The Birth of British R&B: The Life and Times of Johnny Kidd . Lane End: Magnum Imprint, 1996

External links
 Fan site
 Discography
 

1935 births
1966 deaths
English songwriters
English male singers
People from Willesden
Road incident deaths in England
Golders Green Crematorium
20th-century English singers
British rock and roll musicians
20th-century British male singers
Johnny Kidd & the Pirates members
British male songwriters